Hesston may refer to:

Places in the United States
 Hesston, Indiana, an unincorporated community
 Hesston, Kansas, a city
 Hesston, Pennsylvania, an unincorporated community

Other uses
 Hesston College, a two-year college, located in Hesston, Kansas
 Hesston Corporation, an agricultural equipment manufacturer, purchased by AGCO, located in Hesston, Kansas

See also 
 Heston (disambiguation)